William Benet may refer to:

William Rose Benét (1886–1950), American poet, writer, and editor
William Benet (MP) (1381–1463), MP for Canterbury and Mayor of Canterbury
William Benet (diplomat) (died 1533), 16th-century English ambassador

See also
William Bennet (disambiguation)
William Bennett (disambiguation)